Mohammad Hasan Khan Qajar, also spelled Muhammad and Hassan (1715–1759), chief of the Qoyunlu branch of the Qajar tribe of Turkomans in the Caspian coastlands around Astarabad, was the son of Fath Ali Khan and the father of Agha Mohammad Khan Qajar, who founded the Qajar dynasty of Iran.

Mohammad Hasan Khan was driven from Astarabad in the early 1740s, but after the death of Nader Shah in 1747, he appears to have joined Shahrukh Afshar and been appointed beglerbeg of Astarabad and leader of all the nomadic groups in the province by Soleyman II; after the latter was deposed, Mohammad Hasan became virtually independent and extended his power to Mazandaran and Gilan.

After the khan of Tabriz, Azad Khan Afghan, attacked Mohammad Hasan Khan unsuccessfully, the latter counterattacked and ousted Azad Khan from Azerbaijan in 1757, taking Tabriz without a fight (being welcomed by its inhabitants according to one account). After an expedition to ensure the obedience of the khanates of the Caucasus, Mohammad Hasan Khan turned to face Karim Khan Zand; after some successes, penetrating as far south as Shiraz, Karim Khan's most dangerous rival was defeated and killed in Mazandaran in early 1759.

References

Sources
 
 

1722 births
1759 deaths
Assassinated Iranian politicians
People murdered in Iran
Mohammad Hasan Khan
18th-century monarchs in the Middle East
People from Gorgan